Chen Shaoguo (born January 20, 1971) is a retired male race walker from PR China. He competed for his native country at the 1992 Summer Olympics in Barcelona, Spain.

Achievements

References

1971 births
Living people
Athletes (track and field) at the 1992 Summer Olympics
Chinese male racewalkers
Olympic athletes of China
Asian Games medalists in athletics (track and field)
Asian Games gold medalists for China
Medalists at the 1994 Asian Games
Athletes (track and field) at the 1994 Asian Games